William Procter Bolland (1815 – 10 June 1863) was an English first-class cricketer active 1836–43 who played for Marylebone Cricket Club (MCC). He was born in Westminster and died in Clifton, Bristol. He appeared in nine first-class matches.

Notes

Bibliography
Frederic Boase. "Bolland, William Proctor". Modern English Biography. Netherton and Worth. 1892. Volume 1. Page 329. Google Books
John Venn and J A Venn (eds). "Bolland, William Proctor". Alumni Cantabrigienses. Cambridge University Press. Volume 2 (1752 to 1900). Part 1 (Abbey to Challis). 1940. Google Books. Reprinted 2011. Page 311.
M C Rintoul. "Bolland, William Proctor". Dictionary of Real People and Places in Fiction. Routledge. 1993. Page 213.
Charles Shaw. "Bolland, William Procter". The Inns of Court Calendar. Butterworths. Fleet Street, London. 1877. Page 148.
 
Frederick Samuel Ashley-Cooper. Nottinghamshire Cricket and Cricketers. H B Saxton. 1923. Page 48. Google Books.
Nigel McCrery. "I Zinghari". Final Wicket. Pen & Sword Military. 2015. Page 471.
William Bolland. Cricket Notes. Trelawney Saunders. Charing Cross, London. 1851. Google Books.
William Proctor Bolland, "A Disconcerted Lover" (1832) Eton College Magazine, No 5, xii and 167

1815 births
1863 deaths
English cricketers
Marylebone Cricket Club cricketers